John Pesutto (born 5 September 1970) is an Australian politician and lawyer serving as the Leader of the Opposition in Victoria, holding office as the leader of the Victorian Branch of the Liberal Party of Australia. He has been a member of the Legislative Assembly (MLA) for the inner-city division of Hawthorn since 2022, and previously from 2014 to 2018.

Early life and career
Pesutto studied at Catholic Regional College Traralgon from 1983–1988, and studied a Bachelor of Laws / Bachelor of Commerce at the University of Melbourne from 1989–1993. He worked as a lawyer for Littleton Hackford from 1994–1996, as an Electorate Officer for Russell Broadbent from 1996–1997, as a lawyer for Henty Jepson & Kelly from 1997–2006, as a lawyer for Phillips Fox from 2006–2009, as a self-employed consultant from 2009–2011 and Director of the Productivity and Employment Unit with the Institute of Public Affairs in 2010, and in the Office of the Premier from 2011–2014 as Counsel to Denis Napthine, Chief of Staff to the Health Minister and as a Senior Advisor to Ted Baillieu. During his career in private legal practice, Pesutto practised with a focus on industrial relations and employment matters, while his consultancy having a focus on advising government departments and public sector agencies on governance and performance issues.

After losing his seat in the 2018 Victorian state election, Pesutto took up an honorary post in the school of government at the University of Melbourne, established his own consultancy firm called Hugo Benice Advisory offering legal work and media, government and competition advice, and maintained a presence in the media through writing columns for The Age and appearing on ABC Radio and Joy FM.

Political career 
Pesutto ran for Liberal preselection for Kooyong at the 2010 federal election but lost to Josh Frydenberg.

Pesutto was pre-selected to be Liberal candidate for Hawthorn after defeating John Roskam of the Institute of Public Affairs for the position. He was Shadow Attorney General in Matthew Guy's first shadow ministry. He was defeated at the 2018 state election. He was a panelist on ABC on election night when he was told on live television that he lost his seat.

On 14 December 2021, John Pesutto was endorsed as the Liberal Party candidate for Hawthorn at the 2022 Victorian state election. Pesutto won re-election in the state election on 26 November 2022 against Labor incumbent John Kennedy and teal independent challenger Melissa Lowe on a 1.7% margin. After Liberal leader Matthew Guy announced his resignation, Pesutto announced his candidacy for Liberal leader. Pesutto was elected leader of the Liberal Party on 8 December 2022, winning the party room ballot by one vote against Brad Battin.

Pesutto is considered to be a moderate Liberal.

Personal life 
A resident of Hawthorn for over 25 years, Pesutto is married to his wife, Betty, and has three daughters.

See also 
 Shadow ministry of John Pesutto

References

External links

 

1970 births
Living people
Liberal Party of Australia members of the Parliament of Victoria
Members of the Victorian Legislative Assembly
20th-century Australian lawyers
University of Melbourne alumni politicians
Melbourne Law School alumni
Australian politicians of Italian descent
People from Traralgon
21st-century Australian politicians
21st-century Australian lawyers
People from Hawthorn, Victoria